Month of Photography Asia (also known as MOPA and MOPAsia) was an international festival of photography in Singapore from 2002 to 2011.

The festival promoted photography both as an art form and as a creative industry. Each year, Month of Photography Asia was curated along a specific theme and presented works by international and Singaporean photographers in relation to this.

The festival's main line-up of exhibitions was complemented by both public programmes, which included round tables, master classes, talks, portfolio reviews, screenings, tours and workshops.

The festival was first established in 2002 as the Month of Photography in Singapore, on a joint initiative by the Alliance Française de Singapour and the National Arts Council. It was inaugurated in the presence of Jean-Luc Monterosso, director of the European House of Photography, MEP). Phish Communications managed the 2003, 2004 and 2006 editions of the festival. In 2007, the festival took the name of Month of Photography Asia (MOPA or MOPAsia).

Curatorial themes 
From 2004 onwards, a curatorial theme provided the backbone of each edition of the festival:
 2004: Popular Pleasures through Photography
 2006: Le Regard Documentaire
 2007: Wanderings
 2008: Still/Moving: Photography & Cinema
 2009: Engaging Asia
 2010: Praxis
 2011: Memory

Out of Focus 
In 2006, the festival started a series of group shows titled Out of Focus dedicated to emerging Singaporean or Singapore-based photographers who had not yet had a solo show. The first of these was curated by Tay Kay Chin. Objectifs: Centre for Photography and Filmmaking curated in 2007 to 2009.

Residency programme 
In 2008, the festival initiated an artist residency programme in partnership with Lasalle College of the Arts, with the support of the French embassy.  was the first photographer in residence in 2008, followed by Françoise Huguier in 2009.

InsideOut 
In 2009, the festival added InsideOut, a project that aimed to allow the audience to see Singapore through the eyes of migrant workers to foster mutual understanding. First launched in 2006 together with the M1 Singapore Fringe Festival, the project was revived in the 2009 edition of MOPAsia as InsideOut II and continued in 2010 as InsideOut III.

ICON de Martell Cordon Bleu photography award 
In 2010, the festival included the newly created ICON de Martell Cordon Bleu photography award. Established by Martell Cordon Bleu together with the Month of Photography Asia, this juried prize was aimed at recognizing the most outstanding photographer in Singapore who had shown originality of vision, presented thought-provoking ideas, explored new concepts and demonstrated a commitment to his/her photography.

In 2010 the jury included Martin Parr and Agnès de Gouvion Saint-Cyr. Sherman Ong was the winner, awarded a cash prize of $30,000 and publication of a book of their work.

In 2011 the winner was Sean Lee.

Directors 

 Shirlene Noordin, director from 2006 to 2010
 Shirlene Noordin and Raphaël Millet, co-directors in 2011

Notable photographers having solo exhibitions, talks, master classes and residencies 
2002: Marc Riboud, Laure Bonduelle, Lucas Jodogne, Gilles Massot, Keiichi Tahara, Jean-Christophe Ballot, Horst Wackerbarth, and 
2004: Pierre et Gilles
2006: Henri Cartier-Bresson and Robert Doisneau
2007: Martin Parr and Raymond Depardon
2008: , Abbas, Sherman Ong, Sean Lee, and 
2009: Deanna Ng, Françoise Huguier, Steve McCurry, Marc Riboud, and Agnès de Gouvion Saint-Cyr
2010: Sherman Ong, Jing Quek, Francis Ng, Tay Wei Ling, Mattias Klum, Marcel Heijnen, Martin Parr, and Agnès de Gouvion Saint-Cyr
2011: Agan Harahap and Tim Page

Partners 
The festival collaborated closely with the European House of Photography (Maison Européenne de la Photographie) in its first year, and subsequently developed partnerships with photo agencies Magnum Photos and Rapho, as well as with the Henri Cartier-Bresson Foundation and the National Foundation for Contemporary Art (Fonds national d'art contemporain (FNAC)) in Paris, and the George Eastman House in Rochester, New York.

It worked locally with the National Arts Council (Singapore) (NAC), the Singapore Arts Festival, the Lasalle College of the Arts, Objectifs: Centre for Photography and Filmmaking, Migrant Voices, as well as the Cathay Organisation (with its Cathay Gallery).

It partnered with high commissions and embassies, the United States of America Embassy, the British High Commission and the French Embassy in Singapore.

References 

Festivals in Singapore
Photography festivals
2002 establishments in Singapore
2011 disestablishments in Singapore
Arts organizations established in 2002

Arts in Singapore
Art festivals in Singapore